The Roman Catholic Diocese of Tzaneen is a diocese located in the city of Tzaneen in the Ecclesiastical province of Pretoria in South Africa.

History
 December 27, 1962: Established as Apostolic Prefecture of Louis Trichardt from the Territorial Prelature of Pietersburg
 November 16, 1972: Promoted as Diocese of Louis Trichardt – Tzaneen
 July 18, 1987: Renamed as Diocese of Tzaneen

Special churches
 The cathedral is Cathedral of the Most Holy Trinity (1954)

Patron saints of the diocese are:

Our Lady of the Sacred Heart and St. Joseph

Blessed Benedict Daswa, first Catholic martyr recognized by Catholic Church in Southern Africa was beatified on 13 September 2015 in parish of Thohoyandou, the Diocese of Tzaneen.

Leadership
 Prefect Apostolic of Louis Trichardt (Roman rite)
 Fr. John Thomas Durkin, M.S.C. (1963.02.15 – 1972.11.16 see below)
 Bishops of Diocese of Tzaneen (Roman rite)
 Bishop John Thomas Durkin, M.S.C. (see above 1972.11.16 – 1984.06.22)
 Bishop Hugh Patrick Slattery, M.S.C. (1984.06.22-2010.01.28)
 Bishop Joao Noe Rodrigues (since 2010.01.28 appointed, 2010.04.18 consecrated)

See also
Roman Catholicism in South Africa

References

External links
 GCatholic.org 
 Catholic Hierarchy 
 Diocese of Tzaneen

Roman Catholic dioceses in South Africa
Christian organizations established in 1962
Roman Catholic dioceses and prelatures established in the 20th century
1962 establishments in South Africa
Roman Catholic Ecclesiastical Province of Pretoria